Arbutina is a Slavic surname. Notable people with the surname include:

Anđelija Arbutina (born 1967), Serbian basketball player
Igor Arbutina (born 1972), Croatian volleyball coach

See also
Pseudochelaria arbutina, a species of moth

Slavic-language surnames